Attorney General Lewis may refer to:

Ellis Lewis (1798–1871), Attorney General of Pennsylvania
Henry Roger Justin Lewis (fl. 1950s–1970s), Attorney General of Fiji
Merton E. Lewis (1861–1937), Attorney General of New York
Morgan Lewis (governor) (1754–1844), Attorney General of New York

See also
General Lewis (disambiguation)